In the mathematical field of geometric group theory, a length function is a function that assigns a number to each element of a group.

Definition
A length function L : G → R+ on a group G is a function satisfying:

Compare with the axioms for a metric and a filtered algebra.

Word metric

An important example of a length is the word metric: given a presentation of a group by generators and relations, the length of an element is the length of the shortest word expressing it.

Coxeter groups (including the symmetric group) have combinatorial important length functions, using the simple reflections as generators (thus each simple reflection has length 1). See also: length of a Weyl group element.

A longest element of a Coxeter group is both important and unique up to conjugation (up to different choice of simple reflections).

Properties
A group with a length function does not form a filtered group, meaning that the sublevel sets  do not form subgroups in general.

However, the group algebra of a group with a length functions forms a filtered algebra: the axiom  corresponds to the filtration axiom.

Group theory
Geometric group theory